Helenius Acron (or Acro) was a Roman commentator and grammarian, probably of the 3rd century AD, but whose precise date is not known.

Helenius Acron is known to have written on Terence (Adelphi and Eunuchus at least) and Horace.  These commentaries on Horace are now lost but are referred to by the grammarian Charisius.  There is some evidence for a commentary on Persius.

Scholia attributed to Acron appear in manuscripts of Horace; there are three recensions known, the earliest dating to the 5th century.  The fragments which remain of the work on Horace, though much mutilated, are valuable, as containing the remarks of the older commentators, Quintus Terentius Scaurus and others.  The attribution to Acron, however, is not found before the 15th century, and is doubtful.

Fragments of Acron's writing may also appear in Pomponius Porphyrion.

References

External links
Acronis et Porphyrionis commentarii in Q. Horatium Flaccum. Edidit Ferdinandus Hauthal, vol. 1, vol. 2, Berolini sumptibus Julii Springeri, 1864.
 Heleni Acronis commentarium in Horatium Flaccum at www.horatius.net.

3rd-century Romans
Post–Silver Age Latin writers
Grammarians of Latin
Horace
3rd-century Latin writers